PA5 may refer to:
 Paranormal Activity 5, a supernatural horror film
 Pennsylvania Route 5
 Pennsylvania Route 5 (1920s)
 Pennsylvania's 5th congressional district
 Pitcairn PA-5 Mailwing
 The PA5, a type of rolling stock used on the PATH train in New York and New Jersey